William McKinlay was a prosperous tailor and state legislator in Charleston, South Carolina.

Early life 
McKinlay was a free man of color from Charleston. He also had Scottish ancestry.

Career 
He and his brothers Archibald and George owned a tailoring business. He and Archibald owned the McKinlay Building on Market Street and other properties. He was also a director of Enterprise Railroad.

He was elected a delegate to the 1868 South Carolina Constitutional Convention in Charleston. He was appointed to the Charleston City Council in 1868 then elected to the council in November of the same year. He was also elected to the council in 1873.

He was elected to serve in the state legislature during the 1868 term.

Personal life 
McKinlay was a member of the Brown Fellowship Society. He purchased slaves to allow them to live freely even as the law recognized them as his property. At one point the city posted the sale a girl that was his property to satisfy taxes owed. A response was soon after posted that she was free and would not be sold.

He was married to Sarah Jane McKinlay. He died intestate in 1872.

References

Members of the South Carolina House of Representatives
1872 deaths
American people of Scottish descent
19th-century American railroad executives
Politicians from Charleston, South Carolina